Elections in the Republic of India in 2018 included by-elections to the Lok Sabha, elections to the Rajya Sabha, elections to of eight states and numerous other by-elections to state legislative assemblies, councils and local bodies.

The elections were widely considered crucial to the ruling National Democratic Alliance and the opposition United Progressive Alliance for the upcoming general elections in 2019. In seven of the eight states that went to polls this year, the Bharatiya Janata Party was in direct contest with the Indian National Congress. Further, the election results in the states of Karnataka, Madhya Pradesh, Telangana, Chhattisgarh, Mizoram and Rajasthan are considered a barometer of the pulse of the public before the general elections. Elections to the upper house where the ruling National Democratic Alliance does not command a majority are by kicking on the part of all the political leaders expected to strengthen its position.

Background

Political System 
According to the Constitution of India, elections should take place to the parliament and state legislative assemblies every five years, unless an emergency is under operation. Further, any vacancy caused by death or resignation must be filled through an election within six months of occurrence of such vacancy. The elections to the lower houses (in Parliament and in the states) use first past the post system - the candidate with a plurality of the votes wins the election.

Elections to one-third of the seats of the upper house of the Parliament - the Rajya Sabha are conducted every two years. The members of the upper house are elected indirectly by the state legislative assemblies on the basis of proportional representation. Members to the state legislative councils (in states which have an upper house) are elected indirectly through local bodies.

All the elections at the central and state level are conducted by the Election Commission of India while local body elections are conducted by state election commissions.

Parliamentary By-election 

 Alwar (Lok Sabha constituency): Elections were held on 29 January to elect a new member of parliament after the death of the incumbent Mahant Chandnath of the Bharatiya Janata Party. Both the Bharatiya Janata Party and Indian National Congress fielded candidates from the yadav community. 61.77% of the total 18,27,936 voters participated in the election. For the first time in the country, election commission has placed candidates' photos next to their name to help voters identify the candidates. In what was seen as a body blow to the state government, the INC wrested control of the seat from the BJP, with its candidate Karan Singh Yadav winning the seat by a margin of 1,96,496 votes.
 Ajmer (Lok Sabha constituency): Elections were held on 29 January to elect a new member of parliament after the death of the incumbent Sanwar Lal Jat of the Bharatiya Janata Party. 65% of the total 18.43 lakh voters participated in the election. For the first time in the country, the election commission has placed candidates' photos next to their name to help voters identify the candidates. In what was seen as a body blow to the state government, the INC wrested control of the seat from the BJP, its candidate Raghu Sharma won by a margin of 84,238 votes.
 Uluberia (Lok Sabha constituency): Elections were held on 29 January to elect a new member of parliament after the death of Mohammedan Sporting Club's president and All India Trinamool Congress M.P Sultan Ahmed. Trinamool Congress candidate Sajda Ahmed won Uluberia Lok Sabha seat by defeating BJP candidate Anupam Mallick by 4,74,023 votes.

March

May 

4 parliamentary seats were contested on 28 May 2018. The counting of votes took place on May 31.  This election saw the ruling BJP party lose their majority in the lower house of the Indian Parliament

November

3 parliamentary seats had been contested on 3 November 2018 in Karnataka. Results were declared on 6 November 2018.

Legislative assembly elections

Tripura 

Elections were held in Tripura on 18 February 2018 in 59 out of 60 constituencies of the Legislative Assembly. The Left Front led by Manik Sarkar sought re-election, having governed Tripura since the 1998 election. The region in general had been under the political control of the Communist Party for 25 years prior to the election, leading to the region being dubbed a "red holdout". The incumbent Left Front government was defeated after 25 years of office, with the Bharatiya Janata Party and Indigenous Peoples Front of Tripura winning a large majority of seats. The Indian National Congress, which was the second largest party in the 2013 election, lost all its seats and most of its vote share.

Meghalaya 

Elections were held in Meghalaya on 27 February 2018 to elect 59 of 60 members to the Legislative Assembly. The incumbent Indian National Congress government controlled the state in a coalition with smaller parties prior to the election, and sought to retain office. The elections resulted in a hung assembly with no single party or alliance getting the requisite majority of 31 seats in the Vidhan Sabha. Conrad Sangma, leader of the National People's Party, announced that he would form a government with the support of the United Democratic Party and other regional parties. He was sworn in as the Chief Minister, along with eleven other ministers.

Nagaland 

Elections were held in Nagaland on 27 February 2018 in 59 out of 60 constituencies of the Legislative Assembly. The scheduled election in Northern Angami II constituency did not take place as only incumbent MLA Neiphiu Rio was nominated and was therefore declared elected unopposed. The ruling Naga People's Front was challenged by the newly established Nationalist Democratic Progressive Party (NDPP), an ally of the Bharatiya Janata Party. The NDPP and its allies won a majority, with former Chief Minister Neiphiu Rio returning to government.

Karnataka 

Elections were held in Karnataka on 12 May 2018 in 222 out of 224 constituencies of the Legislative Assembly. The incumbent Indian National Congress (INC) was seeking re-election, having governed the state since elections in 2013. The opposition Bharatiya Janata Party (BJP) and Janata Dal (Secular) (JD(S)) sought to regain office. The election led to a hung assembly, with the Bharatiya Janata Party emerging as the single largest party, with 104 seats, but failing to win a majority of seats and popular votes. The Indian National Congress (INC) won the popular vote. Following the election, B. S. Yeddyurappa was appointed Chief Minister and tasked with forming a minority BJP government, but resigned two days later on being unable to prove majority in the assembly. Thereafter the INC and JD(S) which had entered into a post-poll agreement formed a majority coalition government. H.D. Kumaraswamy of Janata Dal (Secular) was subsequently appointed Chief Minister.

Madhya Pradesh

Chhatishgarh

Mizoram

Rajasthan

 

The seat and vote share was as follows:

Telangana

Assembly By-elections

Bihar

Gujarat

Karnataka

Madhya Pradesh

Meghalaya

Odisha

Punjab

Rajasthan

Uttarakhand

West Bengal

Local body elections

Jammu and Kashmir 

Panchayat elections and municipal elections were held in Jammu and Kashmir in 2018 from October 8 till December 11. The last time Panchayat elections were held in the state were in 2011 and the last time municipal elections were held were in 2005.

Uttarakhand 

On 18 November, elections to the local bodies were held in Uttarakhand.

Rural elections

Assam 
 2018 Assam panchayat election

See also
2017 elections in India
2019 elections in India

References

External links

 Lok Sabha Elections Website
 Election Commission of India

 
Elections in India by year